The KJ-200 (Chinese: 空警-200; pinyin: Kōngjǐng Liǎngbǎi; literally: "Airwarn-200") NATO reporting name: Moth or Y-8 Balance Beam system, is an Airborne early warning and control (AEW&C) program developed by Shaanxi Aircraft Corporation. (KJ is from the first characters of the Pinyin spelling of 空警, (Kōng Jǐng), short for 空中预警 (Kōng Zhōng Yù Jǐng), which means Airborne Early Warning).

Design and development
The key component of this aircraft is an AESA radar system, visually similar to the Saab Erieye system, mounted on struts above the rear fuselage, as well as ventral sensor domes. The platform of this aircraft is based on the Shaanxi Y-8F-600 and it has been reported that Pratt & Whitney Canada PW150B turboprops and Honeywell avionics have been incorporated.

The general designer of the KJ-200 is Ouyang Shaoxiu (欧阳绍修), the same general designer of the Y-8. According to Ouyang the KJ-200 has been significantly modified (around 80%) from the original Y-8. including the adoption of a glass cockpit.

Operational history
The project experienced a major setback in 2006, when a KJ-200 crashed into a mountain in Guangde County while undergoing tests.

During the National Day of the People's Republic of China military parade 1 October 2009, a KJ-200 took the role as a lead aircraft.

In February 2017 a US Navy Lockheed P-3 Orion and a KJ-200 inadvertently came close to each other over the South China Sea. The aircraft were within  of each other.

Operators
 People's Republic of China
People's Liberation Army Air Force - 5 KJ-200
People's Liberation Army Navy - 6 KJ-200H

See also
KJ-500
KJ-2000

References

External links
 KJ-200 AWACS Aircraft photos and intro

AWACS aircraft
2000s Chinese military aircraft
Four-engined tractor aircraft
Four-engined turboprop aircraft